Volodymyr Hryhorovych Nikolaychuk (born 29 April 1975) is a backstroke swimmer from Ukraine, who represented his native country at three consecutive Summer Olympics, starting in 1996. He won a bronze and a silver medal at the 2000 European Long Course Championships in Helsinki, Finland.

References

References
 
 

Ukrainian male backstroke swimmers
Swimmers at the 1996 Summer Olympics
Swimmers at the 2000 Summer Olympics
Swimmers at the 2004 Summer Olympics
Olympic swimmers of Ukraine
1975 births
Living people
Place of birth missing (living people)
Medalists at the FINA World Swimming Championships (25 m)
European Aquatics Championships medalists in swimming
Universiade medalists in swimming
Universiade gold medalists for Ukraine
Universiade bronze medalists for Ukraine
Medalists at the 2001 Summer Universiade
Medalists at the 2003 Summer Universiade